Patrick Murphy (born 9 January 1944) is an Irish judoka. He competed in the men's half-heavyweight event at the 1972 Summer Olympics.

References

1944 births
Living people
Irish male judoka
Olympic judoka of Ireland
Judoka at the 1972 Summer Olympics
Place of birth missing (living people)
20th-century Irish people